Pishizan (also Romanized as Pīshīzān) is a village in Qaleh Ganj Rural District, in the Central District of Qaleh Ganj County, Kerman Province, Iran. At the 2006 census, its population was 48, in 11 families.

References 

Populated places in Qaleh Ganj County